Julie Carmen is an American actress, dancer and a licensed psychotherapist. She came to prominence onscreen in the 1980s, for her role in John Cassavetes' film, Gloria (1980), opposite Gena Rowlands.

Acting

Carmen was born in New York City of Spanish, Cuban and German ancestry. Her acting training was with Sanford Meisner at Neighborhood Playhouse and with Uta Hagen and Alice Spivak at HB Studios. Carmen was on the Board of Directors of Women in Film for three years during which time she was the keynote speaker at the WIF Gala at the Beverly Wilshire Hotel, speaking about "The New Wave of Latinos and Latinas in Hollywood". Julie was on the Board of Directors of IFP/West for six years during which time she created the John Cassavetes Award for emerging filmmakers who direct with the experiential style iconic of Cassavetes.

She has starred in a variety of films including Gloria directed by John Cassavetes, Night of the Juggler (1980), Comeback (1982) opposite Eric Burdon, Last Plane Out (1983), Condo , Blue City (1986), Robert Redford's The Milagro Beanfield War (1988), Fright Night Part 2 (1988) as vampire Regine Dandrige, Paint It Black (1989), John Carpenter's In the Mouth of Madness (1995), NYPD Blue (1999) and King of the Jungle (2000) opposite John Leguizamo. Julie starred in Dawn Patrol (2014), You Can't Say No opposite Peter Fonda, and Windows on the World opposite Edward James Olmos.

Carmen appeared on television most recently starring as La Doña on Tales of the Walking Dead and guest starring as Sarah in the 2022 Fall season of Grey's Anatomy. Julie played the female lead in the 1992 NBC mini-series Drugs Wars: The Cocaine Cartel, as well as playing the mother of Angelina Jolie's character in the 1997 Hallmark Entertainment miniseries True Women and the female lead opposite Val Kilmer in Gore Vidal's Billy the Kid directed by Billy Graham. Julie played female lead opposite George C. Scott in two made for television movies, Finding the Way Home and Curacao (also called Deadly Waters). She was a series regular, as Linda Rodriguez Kirkridge, on the short-lived ABC sitcom Condo (1983), and guest starred as Nina, the environmental revolutionary in three first-season (1990) episodes of the HBO original comedy series Dream On.

She danced on Broadway in Luis Valdez's Zoot Suit, and was resident choreographer at INTAR under the direction of Max Ferra. She studied dance at the Merce Cunningham and Erik Hawkins Studios, and Pilates at the original Joseph Pilates studio in NYC, which led to her 1979 teaching position at Ron Fletcher's Pilates Studio in Los Angeles. In 2007, she played the lead role Liz Estrada at the Getty Villa's commissioned update of Lysistrata.

As a producer, Julie Carmen is executive producer of the documentary feature film, Lico Jiménez the Ebony Liszt, directed by musicologist Isidro Betancourt about her great grandfather José Manuel Jiménez Berroa www.licojimenez.com

Psychotherapist
In addition to her career in acting she has subsequently pursued academics, having since become a licensed and practicing psychotherapist. She earned a B.S. in Theater and Choreography from the State University of New York Empire State, a master's degree in Clinical Psychology from Antioch College, and is a Licensed Marriage Family Therapist. She is also certified through the International Association of Yoga Therapists and Yoga Alliance at the ERYT-500 level. Julie is Director of Mental Health at Loyola Marymount University Yoga Therapy Rx and Director of Yoga Therapy for Behavioral Health supervised clinical practicum in co-operation with Venice Family Clinic. Julie published the article, "Informed Consent for Yoga Therapists" in Yoga Therapy Today through the International Association of Yoga Therapists. 

Carmen was trained as a drama therapist by Ramon Gordon of Cell Block Theater. She designed and led the drama therapy and yoga therapy programs at Passages Drug and Alcohol Residential Treatment Center. She was a yoga therapist at Monte Nido Eating Disorder Centers and the Los Angeles School Districts Program for Pregnant Teens.
 
She was referenced in actress Suzanne Somers' books, A New Way to Age and Ageless: The Naked Truth About Bioidentical Hormones in the chapters titled Julie Carmen Yoga.

Filmography

Film

Television

References

https://cal.lmu.edu/event/lmux191012 this verifies some of Julie Carmen's teaching positions at Loyola Marymount University

External links

Living people
American entertainers of Cuban descent
American female dancers
Dancers from New York (state)
American psychotherapists
Actresses from New Jersey
American film actresses
American television actresses
Hispanic and Latino American actresses
Empire State College alumni
People from Essex County, New Jersey
20th-century American actresses
21st-century American actresses
Antioch College alumni
Year of birth missing (living people)